The Carolina Cougarz was a Charter member of the American Basketball Association.  The team was based in Columbia, South Carolina and was established in February 2016 and disbanded in June 2016.  Upon new ownership the name was changed back to The Carolina Cougars to connect with its origins. 

Basketball teams in South Carolina
American Basketball Association (2000–present) teams
Sports in Columbia, South Carolina
2006 establishments in South Carolina
2006 disestablishments in South Carolina
Basketball teams established in 2006
Sports clubs disestablished in 2006